Mario Laframboise (born November 7, 1957) is a Canadian politician who served as Mayor of Notre-Dame-de-la-Paix and Reeve of the Papineau MRC before getting into federal politics. In the 2000 Canadian federal election, Laframboise was elected to the House of Commons of Canada as the Bloc Québécois candidate in the riding of Argenteuil—Papineau—Mirabel. He was easily re-elected in the 2004, 2006 and 2008 elections, however he was defeated in the 2011 election by NDP's Mylène Freeman. A former notary, he was the Bloc critic to the Minister of Transport and later to the Minister of Infrastructure. He was also vice-president of the federal permanent committee of Transport, Infrastructure and Communities.

Laframboise was the Coalition Avenir Québec candidate for the June 11, 2012 by-election in the provincial riding of Argenteuil. He came in third. He was again defeated by Richer in the 2012 general election. In the 2014 general election he switched to the riding of Blainville, where he was elected.

Priorities
During his tenure as MP his priorities were centered on the local economy which is especially dominated by the forestry, tourism and agriculture sectors especially in the Petite-Nation region. When the Conservative government of Stephen Harper was elected to power after the 2006 election, Laframboise urged them to adopt a motion by the Bloc Québécois that would have modified the Employment Insurance Bill which would have helped workers who've lost their jobs - at that time a local Thurso sawmill closed in early 2006.

He mentioned that the Conservatives had promised during the election to create an independent employment insurance program. The MP and his party also wanted measures to help more aged workers when they lost their jobs.

Despite its support over the Kyoto Accord, Laframboise also supported the completion of Autoroute 50 between Gatineau and Lachute in the Laurentians which has been planned for years in order to provide an alternative way to the dangerous Route 148 which was the scene of numerous fatal accidents over the years in the Petite-Nation region. During his mandates, he criticized the lack of participation of the federal government (during the Liberal era) over the construction of it. However, the lack of funding forced the Quebec government to build only a Super-2 highway, while Laframboise wanted a four-lane traditional Autoroute to facilitated a triangular corridor formed by Montreal, Gatineau and the Mont-Tremblant ski resort in the Laurentians. He mentioned that a two-lane highway would become as dangerous as the Route 175 that crossed the Laurentians Wildlife Reserve north of Quebec City.

Electoral record
 

Source: Elections Canada

References

External links
 

1957 births
Bloc Québécois MPs
Living people
Mayors of places in Quebec
Members of the House of Commons of Canada from Quebec
People from Outaouais
Quebec notaries
Coalition Avenir Québec MNAs
21st-century Canadian politicians